The 2003 IIHF Women's World Championships was set to be held in Beijing, China, from April 4–9, 2003. However, it was cancelled due to the SARS crisis. Only the top division event was cancelled, as the lower divisions still had their tournaments. The teams from Russia, Germany, Sweden, and Switzerland were already in China, while the American and Finnish teams were awaiting word on whether they should travel when the IIHF indicated that the Championships were to be postponed or even cancelled.  The move to cancel was a logical one, as the Canadians were under a government order not to travel at all at that time.

The Division I tournament was held in Ventspils, Latvia from March 9 to 15. The Division II tournament was held in Lecco, Italy from March 31 to April 6.

Top Division

Postponed, then cancelled.  Groups for this division were seeded for 2004 based on the 2003 IIHF World Ranking instead of the normal practise of using their most recent finish.

Division I
The Division I tournament was held in Ventspils, Latvia from March 9 to 15.

Japan was promoted to the 2004 IIHF Women's World Championship.

Statistics

Scoring leaders

Goaltending leaders

Division II
Division II tournament was held in Lecco, Italy from March 31 to April 6.

Norway is promoted to the 2004 Division I tournament.

Statistics

Scoring leaders

Goaltending leaders

Division III
The Division III tournament was held in Maribor, Slovenia from March 25 to 31.

Australia is promoted to the 2004 Division II tournament.

Statistics

Scoring leaders

Goaltending leaders

References

External links
 IIHF index for all 2003 tournaments
 Summary from the Women's Hockey Net
 Detailed summary from passionhockey.com

World
World
International ice hockey competitions hosted by Italy
International ice hockey competitions hosted by Latvia
International ice hockey competitions hosted by Slovenia
IIHF Women's World Ice Hockey Championships
2002–03 in Italian ice hockey
World
Women's ice hockey competitions in Italy
April 2003 sports events in Europe
Sport in Ventspils
Lecco
Sport in Maribor